Poor Little Rich Girl may refer to:

Film and TV
 The Poor Little Rich Girl, a 1917 Mary Pickford film
 Poor Little Rich Girl (1936 film), starring Shirley Temple
 Poor Little Rich Girl (1965 film), directed by Andy Warhol
 Poor Little Rich Girl: The Barbara Hutton Story, a 1987 TV movie
 "Poor Little Rich Girl" (The Suite Life of Zack & Cody episode)
Poor Little Rich Girls, a UK Reality TV series

Music
 A Noël Coward song from 1938
 "Poor Little Rich Girl", a 1960s song written by Carole King and Gerry Goffin
 "Poor Little Rich Girl", a song from the album Equator by Uriah Heep
 "Poor Little Rich Girl", a 1970s song performed by The Romantics on their "National Breakout" album
Poe Little Rich Girl, an album by Jacki-O

See also
 Barbara Hutton (1912–1979), American socialite with a troubled life